Laura E. Little is an American legal scholar and author, specializing in conflict of laws, federal courts, humor and the law, the law of freedom of expression, and constitutional law. She is the James G. Schmidt Professor of Law at Temple University School of Law.

Biography 
Little graduated from the University of Pennsylvania, where she majored in economics. She went on to Temple University School of Law, receiving her J.D. During her time in law school, Little served as Editor-in-Chief of Temple Law Review. After graduation, Little served as a law clerk for United States Court of Appeals for the Third Circuit Judge James Hunter III and then clerked for  Supreme Court of the United States Chief Justice William Rehnquist. Little later joined the law firm of Dechert Price & Rhoades and worked in general commercial litigation. In 1989, Little joined Kohn, Savett, Klein & Graf, P.C. where she represented the print media in Philadelphia in First Amendment matters.

In 1990, Little joined the full-time faculty at Temple University's Beasley School of Law. Her law teaching specializes in conflict of laws, federal courts, First Amendment, and constitutional law. Little has received the Temple University "Great Teacher" Award.

Little has served as an appellate advocate and expert consultant on matters related to the conflict of laws, federal jurisdiction, and the U.S. Constitution. She was appointed by the U.S. Court of Appeals for the Third Circuit to argue and brief the case of Trinsey v. Pennsylvania, which challenged senatorial succession processes under the U.S. Constitution's 17th Amendment.

Little's work includes academic analysis of U.S. federal judicial selection, which was quoted, cited, and relied on extensively by the Supreme Court of India in its decision striking down India's system for appointing judges.

Little is the author of a casebook on conflict of laws, and a bar lecturer, preparing students for the conflict of laws section of the Pennsylvania portion of the bar each year. The American Law Institute appointed Little to serve as the Associate Reporter of the Restatement Third of Conflict of Laws in 2014.

Little received a national award for her work, "Regulating Funny: Humor and the Law" published by Cornell Law Review, which analyzes how law prefers certain types of humor in the areas of trademark, contract, and employment discrimination.  Her book, "Guilty Pleasures:  Comedy and Law in America," was published by Oxford University Press in 2018.

Books 
</ref>
</ref>
</ref>

Selected papers 
A Taxonomy of Taxonomies _ J. Legal Ed. _ (2021) (reviewing Pierre Schlag and Amy J. Griffin, How To Do Things With Legal Doctrine (2020)).
Judicial Regulation of Humour in the United States, in Judges, Judging, and Humour (Jessica Milner Davis & Sharon Locklyer, eds., Palgrave MacMillan 2018).  
Laughing at Censorship published by Yale Law Journal (https://law.yale.edu/system/files/area/center/isp/documents/laura_little_-_why_is_censorship_funny_-_fesc.pdf).
Erie’s Unintended Consequences,  52 Akron L. Rev.  275 (solicited Symposium piece 2019).
Conflict of Laws Structure and Vision: Updating a Venerable Discipline, 31 Georgia State L. Rev. 231 (2015).
 Internet Defamation, Freedom of Expression, and the Lessons of Private International Law for the United States published in the European Yearbook of Private International Law, Vol. 14, 2012.
 Just a Joke: Defamatory Humor and Incongruity's Promise published by Southern California Interdisciplinary Law Journal (http://lawweb.usc.edu/why/students/orgs/ilj/assets/docs/21-1%20Little.pdf).
 Regulating Funny: Humor and the Law published by Cornell Law Review (http://www.lawschool.cornell.edu/research/cornell-law-review/upload/Little-2.pdf?q=pedigree-of-courageous-elvis).
 Hairsplitting and Complexity in Conflict of Laws: The Paradox of Formalism published by UC Davis Law Review.
 The ABA's Role in Prescreening Federal Judicial Candidates: Are We Ready to Give Up on the Lawyers? published by William & Mary Bill of Rights Journal (http://scholarship.law.wm.edu/cgi/viewcontent.cgi?article=1344&context=wmborj).
 Hiding with Words: Obfuscation, Avoidance, and Federal Jurisdiction Opinions published by UCLA Law Review.
 Characterization and Legal Discourse published in the Journal of Legal Education.
 Loyalty, Gratitude, and the Federal Judiciary published by the American University Law Review (http://digitalcommons.wcl.american.edu/cgi/viewcontent.cgi?article=1456&context=aulr).

See also 
 List of law clerks of the Supreme Court of the United States (Chief Justice)

References

External links 
 SSRN Author Page
 Temple University Beasley School of Law Faculty Page
 Examples & Explanation for Federal Courts, Third Edition by Laura E. Little 
 Conflict of Laws by Laura E. Little
Guilty Pleasures:  Comedy and Law in America, https://global.oup.com/academic/product/guilty-pleasures-9780190625764?cc=us&lang=en&.

Living people
Temple University faculty
Lawyers from Philadelphia
Temple University Beasley School of Law alumni
University of Pennsylvania alumni
Conflict of laws scholars
Law clerks of the Supreme Court of the United States
American legal scholars
First Amendment scholars
American scholars of constitutional law
Year of birth missing (living people)